Sphingobacterium pakistanense is a  Gram-negative, strictly aerobic and non-motile bacterium from the genus of Sphingobacterium which has been isolated from the rhizosphere of the plant Vigna mungo in Pakistan. Sphingobacterium pakistanense is a plant growth promoting bacterium.

References

Sphingobacteriia
Bacteria described in 2015